Joseph Clark Grew II (born December 20, 1939) is an American prelate of the Episcopal Church, who served as Bishop of Ohio from 1994 to 2004.
:ru:Грю, Джозеф Кларк (второй)

Early life, education, and naval career
Grew was born on December 20, 1939, in New York City, the son of Henry Sturgis Grew, Jr. and Selina Richards Wood. Grew was the great nephew of Joseph Grew, who was an American career diplomat and Foreign Service officer, notably serving as the United States Ambassador to Japan at the time of the Attack on Pearl Harbor. He was educated at St Mark's School in Southborough, Massachusetts and graduated in 1958. He then enrolled in Harvard College, and earned a Bachelor of Arts in 1962. After college, he served in the United States Navy from 1962 to 1967. He also commanded the USS Constitution from June 28, 1965, till April 28, 1967. He became a lieutenant.

Post-naval career
After retiring from the navy, Grew served as a faculty member of Groton School, and then as director of admissions and assistant headmaster, and dean, of the faculty at St Mark's School. On December 27, 1972, he married Sarah (Wendy) Loomis, and together had three children.

Ordained ministry
Grew then enrolled at the Episcopal Divinity School in Cambridge, Massachusetts to study theology. He graduated with a Master of Divinity in 1978, and was ordained to the diaconate on June 18, 1978, and to the priesthood on December 20, 1978. He served as rector of St John's Church in Westwood, Massachusetts from 1978 to 1982, and then rector of Church of the Holy Spirit in Lake Forest, Illinois from 1982 till 1993.

Bishop
Grew was elected on the fifth ballot as the 10th Bishop of Ohio October 9, 1993, and was consecrated to the episcopate on March 5, 1994, by Presiding Bishop Edmond L. Browning. During his episcopacy, he promoted ecumenism, dialogue with other dioceses in Ireland, and support for greater inclusion of women, gay, and lesbian Episcopalians in the church. He retired in 2004, and currently serves at Emmanuel Episcopal Church, Boston.

References

Episcopal Clerical Directory, 2015.

1939 births
Living people
United States Navy officers
Harvard College alumni
Episcopal bishops of Ohio